This is a list of rivers in Suriname.

By drainage basin
This list is arranged by drainage basin, with respective tributaries indented under each larger stream's name.

Atlantic Ocean

Marowijne River
Tapanahony River
Paloemeu River
Gonini River
Lawa River
Litani River
Oelemari River
Marowijnekreek
Suriname River
Commewijne River
Cottica River
Para Creek
Cola Creek
Brokopondo Reservoir
Sara Creek
Gran Rio
Saramacca River
Coppename River
Coesewijne River
Wayambo River
Nickerie River
Wayambo River
Corantijn River
Kabalebo River
Lucie River
Boven Corantijn River
Oronoque River
Sipaliwini River
Kutari River
Coeroeni River

References
Rand McNally, The New International Atlas, 1993.

Suriname